is a passenger railway station located in the city of Kasukabe, Saitama, Japan, operated by the private railway operator Tōbu Railway.

Lines

Station layout
The station consists of two ground-level opposing side platforms serving two tracks, connected to the station building by a footbridge.

Platforms

Adjacent stations

History
Yagisaki Station opened on 17 November 1929.
From 17 March 2012, station numbering was introduced on all Tobu lines, with Yagisaki Station becoming "TD-09".

Passenger statistics
In fiscal 2019, the station was used by an average of 10,646 passengers daily.

Surrounding area
Kasukabe Hashiman Jinja

References

External links

 Yagisaki Station information (Tobu) 

Railway stations in Saitama (city)
Tobu Noda Line
Stations of Tobu Railway
Railway stations in Japan opened in 1929
Kasukabe, Saitama